John Thompson may refer to:

Academics
 J. A. Thompson (1913–2002), Australian biblical scholar
 John D. Thompson (1917–1992), nurse and professor at the Yale School of Public Health
 John G. Thompson (born 1932), American mathematician
 John Thompson (business academic), professor of Entrepreneurship, University of Huddersfield
 John Thompson (sociologist), professor at Cambridge
 John Herd Thompson, Canadian historian
 John N. Thompson, American evolutionary biologist

Business
 John Thompson (American banker) (1802–1891), American banker
 John Fairfield Thompson, Inco chairman
 John L. Thompson (1869–1930), Iowa journalist and businessman
 John Philp Thompson Sr. (1925–2003), American businessman with 7-Eleven
 John Thompson (Canadian banker) (born 1942), non-executive chairman of the board of Toronto-Dominion Bank
 John W. Thompson (born 1949), chairman of the board of Microsoft
 John Thompson (company), a company based in Wolverhampton

Entertainment
 John Thompson (actor) (died 1634), member of the King's Men in the 1621–31 era
 John Thompson (engraver) (1785–1866), English wood engraver
 John Reuben Thompson (1823–1873), American poet, journalist, editor and publisher
 John Edward Thompson (1882–1945), American artist
 John Sylvanus Thompson (1889–1963), American pianist
 John Thompson (Australian poet) (1907–1968), Australian poet and broadcaster
 John Thompson (writer, born 1918) (1918–2002), American poet, critic, professor
 Johnny Thompson (1934–2019), Las Vegas illusionist
 John Thompson (Canadian poet) (1938–1976), Canadian poet
 John Cargill Thompson (1938–2000), Scottish dramatist
 John Douglas Thompson (born 1964), actor
 John Dall Thompson (1920–1971), American actor
 John Thompson Productions, a German pornographic film studio

Military
 John Thompson (soldier, born 1838) (1838–1915), American Civil War soldier and Medal of Honor recipient
 John Thompson (soldier, born 1842) (1842–?), American Indian Wars soldier and Medal of Honor recipient
 John T. Thompson (1860–1940), inventor of the Thompson submachine gun
 John Marlow Thompson (1914–1994), British Second World War Ace and Battle of Britain pilot
 John Thompson (RAF officer) (born 1947), former Royal Air Force officer
 John F. Thompson (general), U.S. Air Force general

Politics

United States
 John Thompson (Louisiana judge) (died 1810), registrar of lands and judge
 John C. Thompson (1790–1831), Vermont lawyer, politician, and judge
 John H. Thompson (politician), Lieutenant Governor of Indiana, 1824–1828
 John Thompson (1749–1823), US congressman from New York
 John Thompson (1809–1890), US congressman from New York
 John Burton Thompson (1810–1874), Whig politician from Kentucky
 John Martin Thompson (1829–1907), lumberman and civic leader
 John McCandless Thompson (1829–1903), US congressman from Pennsylvania
 John R. Thompson (1834–1894), founder of the Grange
 John E. W. Thompson (1860–1918), American diplomat
 John F. Thompson (politician) (1920–1965), Massachusetts state Speaker of the House
 John D. Thompson Jr. (1928–1986), member of the Ohio House of Representatives
 John Thompson (Minnesota politician),  member of the Minnesota House of Representatives

Canada
 John Hall Thompson (1810–1893), Canadian court commissioner and political figure
 Sir John Sparrow David Thompson (1845–1894), Prime Minister of Canada
 J. Enoch Thompson (1846–1932), Canadian politician, diplomat, writer, and businessman
 John W. Thompson (Manitoba politician) (1858–1914), politician in Manitoba, Canada
 John Thompson (Manitoba politician) (1908–1986), Manitoba provincial cabinet minister
 John Thompson (Alberta politician) (1924–2016), Alberta provincial politician

United Kingdom
 John Thompson, 1st Baron Haversham (c. 1648–1710), English politician
 John Thompson (Liberal politician) (1861–1959), British Member of Parliament for East Somerset, 1906–1910
 Jack Thompson (politician) (John Thompson, 1928–2011), British Labour MP for Wansbeck
 John Thomson (diplomat), former British ambassador to Angola

Other
 John Malbon Thompson (1830–1908), Australian politician, MLA for Queensland

Science
 John Vaughan Thompson (1779–1847), British biologist
 John Ashburton Thompson (1846–1915), British-Australian physician
 John Hannay Thompson (1869–c. 1940), British harbour engineer
 John McLean Thompson (1888–1977), Scottish botanist
 Sir J. Eric S. Thompson (John Eric Sidney Thompson, 1898–1975), English archeologist and Mayan scholar
 John Edd Thompson, chief meteorologist for WALA-TV in Mobile, Alabama

Sports

American football
 John Thompson (American football coach) (born 1955), former defensive coordinator for the Ole Miss football team
 John Thompson (American football executive) (1927–2022), American football executive
 John Thompson (tight end) (born 1957), American football player

Association football
 John Thompson (footballer, born 1888) (1888–1984), English footballer for Sunderland
 Ernie Thompson (footballer, born 1909) (John Ernest Thompson, 1909–1985), Manchester United F.C. player in the 1930s
 John Thompson (footballer, born 1932) (1932–2006), English football goalkeeper who played for Newcastle United and Lincoln City
 John Thompson (footballer, born 1981), Irish professional footballer

Australian football
 John Thompson (Australian footballer, born 1903) (1903–1985), Australian rules footballer for North Melbourne
 John Thompson (Australian footballer, born 1938) (1938–1999), Australian rules footballer for Richmond

Baseball
 Jocko Thompson (John Samuel Thompson, 1917–1988), Major League Baseball pitcher
 Tug Thompson (John Parkinson Thompson, 1856–1938), Major League Baseball outfielder

Basketball
 John Thompson (basketball) (1941–2020), American basketball player and Hall of Fame coach at Georgetown University
 John Thompson III (born 1966), his son, also former basketball coach at Georgetown
 Cat Thompson (John Ashworth Thompson, 1906–1990), American basketball player

Cricket
 John Thompson (cricketer, born 1870) (1870–1945), English cricketer
 John Thompson (cricketer, born 1918) (1918–2010), English cricketer

Rugby
 John Thompson (rugby union) (c. 1886–c. 1978), rugby union player who represented Australia
 John Thompson (rugby league) (born 1959), rugby league footballer of the 1970s, 1980s and 1990s

Other sports
 John Garcia Thompson (born 1979), British beach volleyball player
 John Thompson (boxer) (born 1989), professional boxer

Other
 John Thompson (priest) (died 1571), Canon of Windsor
 John Thompson (journalist) (1928–2017), British journalist
 John Thompson (landscape architect) (1941–2015), British landscape architect for the city of Oxford
 Jack Thompson (activist) (John Bruce Thompson, born 1951), Florida lawyer
 John H. Thompson (born 1951), American statistician, Census Director
 John Thompson (convict), convict of the colony of New South Wales
 John Thompson (inventor) (born 1959), inventor of the Lingo programming language
 Sir John Thompson (judge) (1907–1995), British barrister and judge
 John Rosolu Bankole Thompson (1936–2021), Sierra Leonean judge and jurist
 Snowshoe Thompson (John Albert Thompson, 1827–1876), mail carrier across the Sierras
 John Thompson, exonerated death row inmate, party in United States Supreme Court case Connick v. Thompson

See also
Jon Thompson (disambiguation)
John Thomson (disambiguation)
Jack Thompson (disambiguation)
Jonathan Thompson (disambiguation)
Thompson (disambiguation)